Andrew Michael Bruckner (born December 17, 1932) is an American retired mathematician, known for his contributions to real analysis.

He got his PhD in mathematics from University of California, Los Angeles (1959) on the dissertation Minimal Superadditive Extensions of Superadditive Functions advised by John Green (mathematician).
He joined the faculty at University of California, Santa Barbara.
The "Andy Award" is given annually in his name, to significant contributors to real analysis.

In 2012 he became a fellow of the American Mathematical Society.

Books
Differentiation of real functions (American Mathematical Society, 1994)
Real analysis (1997). With Judith B. Bruckner and Brian S. Thomson.
Elementary real analysis (2001). With B. Thomson and J. Bruckner.

References

20th-century American mathematicians
21st-century American mathematicians
University of California, Los Angeles alumni
University of California, Santa Barbara faculty
Fellows of the American Mathematical Society
Living people
1932 births